Go With Noakes was a BBC Television children's programme, broadcast between 28 March 1976 and 21 December 1980.

A documentary series, it was presented by John Noakes initially alongside, then following his departure from, Blue Peter in 1978. Broadly similar to the reports he made for that programme, each episode had an adventure-based outdoor theme in keeping with Noakes's reputation on Blue Peter as a man of action. Noakes was accompanied on most installments by Shep the dog, who had left Blue Peter at the same time. One episode featured the Blue Peter pony for the disabled 'Rags'. Travelling around the country, they got involved in diverse activities like motor racing, rowing, aerobatics and painting. In each series Noakes was featured travelling around Britain in a particular mode, e.g. sailing, narrow boat, walking, open top car, etc.

The series was produced by BBC Manchester and began on 28 March 1976, running for six series and 31 episodes. The last edition was transmitted on 21 December 1980. Being made on film allowed great flexibility with the shooting and editing of each week's subject matter. An example of the first series run was where Noakes met the RAF's Red Arrows aerial display team (first broadcast 11 April 1976). This edition is available to view  on the BBC's Archive website and shows Noakes sitting in on the teams' debriefing, taking part in a simulated flying lesson as well as being a passenger in a practice display before helping the ground crew prepare the team for a big show. In the programme, Noakes references his former occupation where he trained as an aircraft engine fitter for the RAF and BOAC before deciding to become an actor.

The theme-tune for the series was 'On Ilkla Moor Baht 'at' ('On Ilkley Moor, without a hat'), a popular Yorkshire folk song sung to the tune of the hymn 'Cranbrook'.  It was a reference to Noakes's own Yorkshire heritage. The end theme though was a different tune, the middle section of a piece called 'The Rovers Return' by Edrich Siebert.

A series of repeats was later broadcast under the title Look Back With Noakes.

A similar series entitled Duncan Dares hosted by one of Noakes's successors on Blue Peter, Peter Duncan, followed in 1985.

Go With Noakes

Series 1
Six episodes broadcast Sundays on BBC1 (except episode 5 broadcast Tuesday). Due to regional opt-outs, BBC1 Wales showed episodes 1-4 and 6 in June–July 1976.
Producer: David Brown

Series 2
Five episodes broadcast Sundays on BBC1. Producer: David Brown

Series 3
Two episodes broadcast Fridays on BBC1. Producer: David Brown

Series 4
A series of six holiday trips broadcast Sundays on BBC1.
Producer: David Brown

Series 5
A six-part voyage of discovery around the coasts of Britain with John Noakes and Shep broadcast Sundays on BBC1.
Producer: David Brown

Series 6
Six programmes in which John Noakes and Shep take a Sunday afternoon drive down the by-ways of Britain broadcast on BBC1.
Producer: David Brown

Look Back With Noakes

Series 1

1. Paddlers Must Wear Life Jackets (Wednesday 21 December 1983, 12:05PM BBC1)
2. The Walk Will Do You Good (Thursday 22 December 1983, 12:00PM BBC1)
3. Down To Land's End (Monday 26 December 1983, 12:00PM BBC1)
4. The Oxford Bumps (Tuesday 27 December 1983, 12:00PM BBC1)
5. Up The Road To The Isles (Wednesday 28 December 1983, 12:00PM BBC1)
6. The Lakeland Games (Tuesday 3 January 1984, 12:00PM BBC1)
7. Along The South Downs (Wednesday 4 January 1984, 12:00PM BBC1)
8. The Guernsey Handicap (Thursday 5 January 1984, 12:00PM BBC1)

Series 2

1. By Caravan Through Kerry (Monday 16 April 1984, 9:20AM BBC1)
2. You Might Win A Wee Prize! (Tuesday 17 April 1984, 9:20AM BBC1)
3. Around The Cheshire Ring (Wednesday 18 April 1984, 9:20AM BBC1)
4. Castleford Rules OK? (Thursday 19 April 1984, 9:20AM BBC1)
5. From Lamlash to Inverness (Wednesday 25 April 1984, 9:20AM BBC1)
6. From Queensferry to Whitby (Thursday 26 April 1984, 9:20AM BBC1)
7. From Wells-Next-The-Sea to Woodbridge (Friday 27 April 1984, 9:20AM BBC1)

Series 3

1. Blaenau Ffestiniog Here we Come (Sunday 1 July 1984, 9:35AM BBC1)
2. Down to Land's End (Sunday 8 July 1984, 9:30AM BBC1)
3. By Caravan Through Kerry (Sunday 15 July 1984, 9:30AM BBC1)

References

External links
Go With Noakes at the BFI Website
http://genome.ch.bbc.co.uk/search/0/20?order=asc&q=%22duncan+dares%22#search

British children's television series
1976 British television series debuts
1980 British television series endings
1970s British children's television series
1980s British children's television series